Trinchesia  genovae is a species of sea slug, an aeolid nudibranch, a marine gastropod mollusc in the family Trinchesiidae.

Distribution
This species was described from Genoa, Italy. It has been reported from the NE Atlantic from Mulroy Bay, County Donegal
 
and Lough Hyne, County Cork, Ireland south to Portugal and in the Mediterranean Sea.

Description 
This species was previously confused with Tenellia foliata. The typical adult size of this species is 5–6 mm.

References 

 Gofas, S.; Le Renard, J.; Bouchet, P. (2001). Mollusca. in: Costello, M.J. et al. (eds), European Register of Marine Species: a check-list of the marine species in Europe and a bibliography of guides to their identification. Patrimoines Naturels. 50: 180-213

External links
 Korshunova, T.; Martynov, A.; Picton, B. (2017). Ontogeny as an important part of integrative taxonomy in tergipedid aeolidaceans (Gastropoda: Nudibranchia) with a description of a new genus and species from the Barents Sea. Zootaxa. 4324(1): 1

Trinchesiidae
Gastropods described in 1926